Shin Baek-cheol (Hangul: 신백철; born 19 October 1989) is a mixed and men's doubles badminton player from South Korea. He is a World, Asian and World Junior Champions, as well a gold medalists in the Asian Games and Summer Universiade.

Career 
Shin started to play badminton at the age of 8 in Wallgot Elementary School. He later belonged to the badminton team of the Korea National Sport University before moving to Gimcheon City Hall in 2012. In February 2009, Shin replaced Jung Jae-sung as Lee Yong-dae's partner. They won German Open  after beating Japan's Kenichi Hayakawa and Kenta Kazuno. Shin and his mixed doubles partner, Yoo Hyun-young, reached the final of Swiss Open in March. They lost to second-seeded Lee Yong-dae and Lee Hyo-jung 14-21 and 18–21. He also won the gold medal at the 2010 Guangzhou Asian Games in the mixed doubles event partnered with Lee Hyo-jung.

In 2014 Copenhagen World Championships, He and his partner Ko Sung-hyun created one of the biggest upsets in badminton world championship final history with a victory over their compatriots, Lee Yong-dae and Yoo Yeon-seong 22–20, 21–23, 21–18.

In October 2016, BWF announced Shin Baek-cheol's retirement. Shin actually announced that he left the Korean national team before the Rio Olympic 2016, but he didn't confirm that he retired from badminton. After his retirement, Shin was no longer eligible to enter the BWF international ranking tournament until he turned 31 years of age, based on the regulations from the Badminton Korea Association. Shin and his partner Ko Sung-hyun then made an injunction to the Seoul high courts by rejecting the BKA regulations. In May 2018, Shin and Ko finally got a chance to compete in the international tournament, after won their one-year legal battle against BKA.

Achievements

BWF World Championships 
Men's doubles

Mixed doubles

Asian Games 
Mixed doubles

Asian Championships 
Men's doubles

Mixed doubles

Summer Universiade 
Mixed doubles

BWF World Junior Championships 
Boys' doubles

Mixed doubles

Asian Junior Championships 
Mixed doubles

BWF World Tour (4 titles, 2 runners-up) 
The BWF World Tour, which was announced on 19 March 2017 and implemented in 2018, is a series of elite badminton tournaments sanctioned by the Badminton World Federation (BWF). The BWF World Tour is divided into levels of World Tour Finals, Super 1000, Super 750, Super 500, Super 300 (part of the HSBC World Tour), and the BWF Tour Super 100.

Men's doubles

BWF Superseries (2 titles, 2 runners-up) 
The BWF Superseries, which was launched on 14 December 2006 and implemented in 2007, was a series of elite badminton tournaments, sanctioned by the Badminton World Federation (BWF). BWF Superseries levels were Superseries and Superseries Premier. A season of Superseries consisted of twelve tournaments around the world that had been introduced since 2011. Successful players were invited to the Superseries Finals, which were held at the end of each year.

Men's doubles

Mixed doubles

  BWF Superseries Finals tournament
  BWF Superseries Premier tournament
  BWF Superseries tournament

BWF Grand Prix (9 titles, 8 runners-up) 
The BWF Grand Prix had two levels, the Grand Prix and Grand Prix Gold. It was a series of badminton tournaments sanctioned by the Badminton World Federation (BWF) and played between 2007 and 2017.

Men's doubles

Mixed doubles

  BWF Grand Prix Gold tournament
  BWF Grand Prix tournament

BWF International Challenge/Series (4 titles, 2 runners-up) 
Men's doubles

Mixed doubles

  BWF International Challenge tournament
  BWF International Series tournament

References

External links 
 

1989 births
Living people
People from Gimpo
South Korean male badminton players
Badminton players at the 2010 Asian Games
Badminton players at the 2014 Asian Games
Asian Games gold medalists for South Korea
Asian Games silver medalists for South Korea
Asian Games medalists in badminton
Medalists at the 2010 Asian Games
Medalists at the 2014 Asian Games
Universiade gold medalists for South Korea
Universiade medalists in badminton
Medalists at the 2011 Summer Universiade
Sportspeople from Gyeonggi Province